L'Aquila railway station serves the city and comune of L'Aquila, in the region of Abruzzo, southern Italy.  Opened in 1875, it forms part of the Terni–Sulmona railway.

The station is currently managed by Rete Ferroviaria Italiana (RFI).  However, the commercial area of the passenger building is managed by Centostazioni.  Train services between L'Aquila and Sulmona are operated by Trenitalia.  Each of these companies is a subsidiary of Ferrovie dello Stato (FS), Italy's state-owned rail company.

Train services between L'Aquila and Terni are operated by Ferrovia Centrale Umbra, a company owned by the province of Perugia.

Location
L'Aquila railway station is situated in Piazzale Stazione, to the west of the city centre.

History
The station was built by the Società per le Strade Ferrate Meridionali.  It was opened on 10 May 1875, upon the inauguration of the Molina–L'Aquila section of the Terni–Sulmona railway, which was being constructed as a strategic rail link to Castellammare Adriatico (now Pescara), an important node in the Adriatic Railway.

Until 28 October 1883, the date of entry into service of the line's extension to Rieti and Terni, the station carried out the functions of a terminal station.  It then became an intermediate station.  Between 1922 and 1933, it was flanked by SIA railway station, terminus of the short lived Capitignano line.

World War II led to the devastation of the station premises.  On 8 December 1943, Allied planes bombed the station, claiming hundreds of civilian and military casualties.  In 1951, the passenger building was rebuilt in 1951 as a project of the architect Roberto Narducci.

The station has seen its importance decrease following the increase in road traffic, especially after the entry into operation of the Rome–Aquila motorway, and culminating with the closure in 1987 of the direct line Freccia del Gran Sasso, the direct connection with Rome. The station was damaged by the earthquake that hit L'Aquila in 2009, but came back into operation a few days after the earthquake.

Train movements

The trains stopping at the station are regional trains to Sulmona and Terni.

Since 15 June 2008, the train service to Terni has been operated by Ferrovia Centrale Umbra, which has taken on the management of the Terni-L'Aquila section following the reorganization of regional rail transport.

The station is served by the following service(s):

Regional services (Treno regionale) L'Aquila - Sulmona
Regional services (Treno regionale) Terni - Rieti - L'Aquila

See also

History of rail transport in Italy
List of railway stations in Abruzzo
Rail transport in Italy
Railway stations in Italy

References

External links

Description and pictures of L'Aquila railway station 

This article is based upon a translation of the Italian language version as at December 2010.

Railway stations in Abruzzo
Railway stations opened in 1875
1875 establishments in Italy
Buildings and structures in L'Aquila
Railway stations in Italy opened in the 19th century